Baoshan may refer to:

 Baoshan, Yunnan, prefecture-level city
 Baoshan Airport
 Baoshan District, Shanghai
 Baoshan District, Shuangyashan, Heilongjiang
 Baoshan Road station, Shanghai Metro

People
 Baoshan (given name)

Towns
 Baoshan, Beijing (zh), subdivision of Huairou District, Beijing
 Baoshan, Suihua (zh), subdivision of Beilin District, Suihua, Heilongjiang
 Baoshan, Inner Mongolia (zh), subdivision of Morin Banner, Inner Mongolia
 Baoshan, Liaoning (zh), subdivision of Fengcheng, Liaoning
 Baoshan, Shandong (zh), subdivision of Huangdao District, Qingdao, Shandong
 Baoshan, Xuanwei (zh), subdivision of Xuanwei, Yunnan

Townships
Baoshan Township, Jiangxi (zh), subdivision of Wan'an County, Jiangxi
Baoshan Township, Jilin (zh), subdivision of Panshi, Jilin
Baoshan Township, Gannan County (zh), subdivision of Gannan County, Heilongjiang
Baoshan Township, Xunke County (zh), subdivision of Xunke County, Heilongjiang
Baoshan Township, Yunnan (zh), in Yulong Naxi Autonomous County, Yunnan
Baoshan Township, Hsinchu County, Taiwan